Virtu may refer to:
 Virtù, a theoretical concept elucidated by Niccolò Machiavelli
 Virtu Financial, a high frequency trading company
 Virtu Ferries, a Maltese company founded in 1988 that operates ferry services from Malta to Sicily
 Virtu Foundation, a non-profit organization that supports higher level music education
 The SGI Virtu, a 2008 visualization-oriented computer product line consisting of a server manufactured by Silicon Graphics and a desktop workstation marketed by Silicon Graphics and manufactured by BOXX Technologies